Benoit is an unincorporated community in the towns of Keystone and Mason, Bayfield County, Wisconsin, United States. It is along County Highway F.  Benoit is 13 miles southwest of the city of Ashland. Nearby is the junction of U.S. Highway 2 and U.S. Highway 63.

History
The community was named for Antoine Benoit, a pioneer French settler. Other names before Benoit included Thirty Miles Siding, Peckville, Peck and Benoitville.

Notes

Unincorporated communities in Wisconsin
Unincorporated communities in Bayfield County, Wisconsin